The Coinage (Measurement) Act 2011 (c. 17) is an Act of the Parliament of the United Kingdom.

It amends s.1 and s.3 of the Coinage Act 1971 to allow the method for measuring and confirming the weight of coins to be set by proclamation, rather than the fixed statutory method of using a test sample of less than 1 kg in weight. This was necessary in order for the Royal Mint to strike 1 kg gold and silver coins to commemorate the 2012 Summer Olympics in London.

The bill was presented to parliament on the 30 June 2010, and received royal assent into law on 3 November 2011.

References

Further reading

External links

United Kingdom Acts of Parliament 2011
Coins of the United Kingdom
2011 in economics
Currency law in the United Kingdom